Antiestrogens, also known as estrogen antagonists or estrogen blockers, are a class of drugs which prevent estrogens like estradiol from mediating their biological effects in the body. They act by blocking the estrogen receptor (ER) and/or inhibiting or suppressing estrogen production. Antiestrogens are one of three types of sex hormone antagonists, the others being antiandrogens and antiprogestogens. Antiestrogens are commonly used to stop steroid hormones, estrogen, from binding to the estrogen receptors leading to the decrease of estrogen levels. Decreased levels of estrogen can lead to complications in sexual development. Antiandrogens are sex hormone antagonists which are able to lower the production and the effects that testosterone can have on female bodies.

Types and examples
Antiestrogens include selective estrogen receptor modulators (SERMs) like tamoxifen, clomifene, and raloxifene, the ER silent antagonist and selective estrogen receptor degrader (SERD) fulvestrant, aromatase inhibitors (AIs) like anastrozole, and antigonadotropins including androgens/anabolic steroids, progestogens, and GnRH analogues.

Estrogen receptors (ER) like ERα and ERβ include activation function 1 (AF1) domain and activation function 2 (AF2) domain in which SERMS act as antagonists for the AF2 domain, while “pure” antiestrogens like ICI 182,780 and ICI 164,384 are antagonists for the AF1 and AF2 domains.

Although aromatase inhibitors and antigonadotropins can be considered antiestrogens by some definitions, they are often treated as distinct classes. Aromatase inhibitors and antigonadotropins reduce the production of estrogen, while the term "antiestrogen" is often reserved for agents reducing the response to estrogen.

Medical uses
Antiestrogens are used for:

 Estrogen deprivation therapy in the treatment of ER-positive breast cancer
 Ovulation induction in infertility due to anovulation
 Male hypogonadism
 Gynecomastia (breast development in men)
 A component of hormone replacement therapy for transgender men

Side effects
Side effects of antiestrogens include hot flashes, osteoporosis, breast atrophy, vaginal dryness, and vaginal atrophy. In addition, they may cause depression and reduced libido.

Pharmacology
Antiestrogens act as antagonists of the estrogen receptors, ERα and ERβ.

History
The first nonsteroidal antiestrogen was discovered by Lerner and coworkers in 1958. Ethamoxytriphetol (MER-25) was the first antagonist of the ER to be discovered, followed by clomifene and tamoxifen.

See also 
 Antiestrogen withdrawal response
 Estrogen synthesis inhibitor

References

External links 
 

 
Hormonal antineoplastic drugs
Progonadotropins